The Kautz Glacier is a narrow glacier on the southern flank of Mount Rainier in Washington.

Just before it meets the Success Glacier, the Kautz makes a right turn and heads west for a short distance. After the two glaciers meet, the resultant glacier reaches down to about  before terminating. Meltwater from the glacier drains into Kautz Creek Falls and into Kautz Creek, a tributary of the Nisqually River.

Debris flows
The glacier is one of four on Mount Rainier that are known to have released debris flows. Similar flows have stemmed from the Nisqually, Winthrop, and South Tahoma glaciers as well. The glacier released a particularly large mudflow on October 2–3, 1947, when heavy rains melted and eroded the lower part of the glacier. The meltwater transformed into a 14 billion ft3 (40 million m3) mudflow replete with large boulders up to 13 feet (4 m) in diameter. The flow buried Highway 706 in 28 feet (9 m) of sediment and watery debris. Deposits from the 1947 mudflow can still be seen today. Smaller flows occurred in the years 1961, 1985 and 1986.

See also
List of glaciers

References

Glaciers of Mount Rainier
Glaciers of Washington (state)